The Battle of Cockpit Point, the Battle of Freestone Point, or the Battle of Shipping Point, took place on January 3, 1862, in Prince William County, Virginia, as part of the blockade of the Potomac River during the American Civil War.

After victory at First Battle of Bull Run, the Confederate States Army (CSA) established a defensive line from Centreville along the Occoquan River to the Potomac River. The Confederates used the Potomac’s banks as gun positions to halt Union traffic on the river, protecting Manassas Junction to the west and Fredericksburg to the south and to close the Potomac River to shipping and isolate Washington.

By mid-December, the Confederates had 37 heavy guns in position along the river.

Union ships approached the point again on March 9. A landing party from Anacostia and Yankee destroyed abandoned Confederate batteries at Cockpit Point and Evansport, Virginia, and found CSS Page blown up. The Confederates, in keeping with their general tactic of withdrawal from the sea coast and coastal islands, had abandoned their works and retired closer to Richmond, after effectively sealing off the Potomac River for nearly five months.

Legacy
Prince William County is in the process of establishing the Cockpit Point Battlefield Heritage Park at Cockpit Point to open in 2017. The park will preserve 113 acres, including a 93 acre natural area with a pond. The park area has a 16 acre gun battery site along the Potomac River, including cannon emplacements.

References
National Park Service battle description
Harper's Weekly of November 2, 1861 hosted on the Son of the South website.
Harper's Weekly of March 22, 1862 hosted on the Son of the South website.
Virginia Forts information from American Forts Network, compiled by Pete Payette.
Naval History of the Civil War March 1862
Two Wars, an Autobiography of General Samuel G. French
Freestone Point Earthworks Civil War Trails Historical Marker

External links
Cockpit Point Battlefield Heritage Park at Prince William County, Virginia

1862 in Virginia
Cockpit Point
Cockpit Point
Cockpit Point
Cockpit Point
Prince William County in the American Civil War
Battles and conflicts without fatalities
1862 in the American Civil War
Riverine warfare
January 1862 events